Hassan Hassan (born 9 March 1963) is an Iraqi sports shooter. He competed at the 1992 Summer Olympics and the 1996 Summer Olympics.

References

1963 births
Living people
Iraqi male sport shooters
Olympic shooters of Iraq
Shooters at the 1992 Summer Olympics
Shooters at the 1996 Summer Olympics
Place of birth missing (living people)